Ogmuna is a village in the tehsil Tangmarg in the Baramulla district of Indian union territory of Jammu and Kashmir.

History
Ogmuna is an old village in tehsil Karhama and district Baramulla. It is being said the famous saint (Reshi) of Kashmir Sheikh Noor-ud-din Wali, has visited this village and has said about it, Wagmuni vuch ma'ie dastaar vo'le. Thus it is evident that this village has come into being very early. This village gave birth to various famous personalities in which the most famous is, the Kashmir's well known Sufi poet Anwar War. Anwar War has a unique status in Gulfam Cultural Academy Srinagar and Radio Kashmir Srinagar.

Geography
It falls in newly carved tehsil Karhama.
It is located to the left side of Srinagar to Gulmarg road and on the bank of river 
Nala Ferozpora. Nalal Ferozpora is the only river which irrigate the whole area from Tangmarg to Magam. It originates from the area of famous tourist resort Drung. Ogmuna is also known as a center of its area due to its specific peculiarity and qualities. It has gained a particular position among other villages which are in its locality. To its North there are two villages named as Kashmatipora and Gonipora and to its South there are many villages but closest to them are Devpora and Dardpora. To its East there is a village referred as Karhama and to its West there is only village Bongam to which Ogmuna is about to meet through new constructions. The land available in the village for agriculture i.e. for the cultivation of rice and maize, is more than other villages which are in its locality. There is also a hillside, where there are a large number of apple and other fruit orchards which help the people of Ogmuna in enhancing its economy. This hillside give a beautiful look to visitors travelers and passers-by.

References

Villages in Baramulla district